New Era Public School is a co-educational English medium Private School, based on C.B.S.E. curriculum at Laheriasarai, Darbhanga, Bihar. It focuses on overall development of students while special emphasis is laid upon learning with fun. It was founded in the year 2016.

References

Education in Darbhanga
Schools in Bihar
2016 establishments in Bihar
Educational institutions established in 2016